The Copa do Brasil 1995 is the 7th staging of the Copa do Brasil.

The competition started on February 14, 1995, and concluded on June 21, 1995, with the second leg of the final, held at the Olímpico in Porto Alegre, in which Corinthians lifted the trophy for the first time after defeating Grêmio 1-0.

Preliminary round

|}

Knockout round

Semifinals

|}

Finals

|}

Champion

External links
 Copa do Brasil 1995 at RSSSF

1995
1995 in Brazilian football
1995 domestic association football cups